Kenneth Purchase (8 January 1939 – 28 August 2016) was a British Labour Co-operative politician who served as Member of Parliament for Wolverhampton North East from 1992 to 2010.

Early life
He attended Springfield Secondary Modern School (became Woden Primary School) on Springfield Road in Wolverhampton. At Wolverhampton Polytechnic, (now Wolverhampton University) he gained a BA in Social Science. Ken worked as a co-operative development officer. He was an apprentice toolmaker in the foundry industry from 1956–60 at the firm of Arthur Shaw & Company at Willenhall From 1960–8, he worked in experimental component development in the aerospace industry. From 1968–76, he was a toolroom machinist in the car industry. He worked in the property division of Telford Development Corporation. From 1981–2, he was a housing officer in the Housing Department of Walsall Metropolitan Borough Council. From 1982–92, he was a Business Development Advisor at Black Country CDA Ltd. He was a councillor on Wolverhampton Metropolitan Borough Council from 1970–90.

Parliamentary career
He unsuccessfully contested Wolverhampton North East in 1987, before winning at the next general election in 1992. He served as Parliamentary Private Secretary to Robin Cook for six years.

On 27 October 2007 Purchase announced his intention to retire at the next general election.

Personal life
He married Brenda Sanders on 20 August 1960 in Rowley Regis. They had two daughters, Samantha and Lisa, who survived him. He died in August 2016 aged 77 and was cremated at Bushbury Crematorium, Wolverhampton.

References

External links 
 Guardian Unlimited Politics – Ask Aristotle: Ken Purchase MP
 TheyWorkForYou.com – Ken Purchase MP
 
 BBC Politics 
 Ken Purchase official site

News items
 Dog owners in May 2002

1939 births
2016 deaths
Labour Co-operative MPs for English constituencies
UK MPs 1992–1997
UK MPs 1997–2001
UK MPs 2001–2005
UK MPs 2005–2010
People from Wolverhampton
Alumni of the University of Wolverhampton
Councillors in Wolverhampton